The Stetson Hatters baseball team represents Stetson University, which is located in DeLand, Florida. The Hatters are an NCAA Division I college baseball program that competes in the ASUN Conference. They began competing in Division I in 1972 and joined the ASUN Conference in 1986.

The Stetson Hatters play all home games off-campus at Melching Field at Conrad Park. Since their promotion to Division I in 1972, the Hatters have played in 18 NCAA Tournaments and hosted and won their first regional in 2018. Over their 34 seasons in the ASUN Conference (formerly the Trans America Athletic Conference), they have won six conference regular season titles and eight conference tournaments.

Since the program's inception in 1901, 10 Hatters have gone on to play in Major League Baseball, highlighted by recent Cy Young Award winners Jacob deGrom and Corey Kluber. Under current head coach Steve Trimper, nine Hatters have been drafted, including Logan Gilbert who was selected in the first round of the 2018 Major League Baseball draft.

Conference membership history (Division I only) 
1972–1985: Independent
1986–present: Trans America Athletic Conference / ASUN Conference

Melching Field at Conrad Park 

Melching Field at Conrad Park is a baseball stadium in DeLand, Florida, that seats 2,500 people. It was opened on February 12, 1999, with a 4–3 win over Louisville. A record attendance of 2,975 was set on March 20, 2007, during a non-conference game against Florida.

Head coaches (Division I only) 
Records taken from the 2019 Stetson Baseball Guide

Year-by-year NCAA Division I results
Records taken from the 2019 Stetson Baseball Guide

NCAA Division I Tournament history
The NCAA Division I baseball tournament started in 1947.
The format of the tournament has changed through the years.
Stetson began playing Division I baseball in 1972.

Awards and honors (Division I only)

All-Americans

Freshman First-Team All-Americans

Trans America Athletic Conference / ASUN Conference Player of the Year

Trans America Athletic Conference / ASUN Conference Pitcher of the Year

Trans America Athletic Conference / ASUN Conference Freshman of the Year

Taken from the 2019 Stetson baseball guide. Updated September 7, 2019.

Hatters in the Major Leagues

Taken from the 2019 Stetson baseball guide. Updated September 6, 2019.

References